Casey Jones  was a straight edge hardcore punk band from Jacksonville, Florida. The band consisted of members from Evergreen Terrace and Anchors Away and was signed to Eulogy Records. They released three albums and a split 7-inch

History

Casey Jones formed in early 2003 as a side project of Evergreen Terrace. The band's name is taken from the Teenage Mutant Ninja Turtles character Casey Jones.

The band was originally started by Josh James of Evergreen Terrace, his brother Caleb, and Josh Smith (former member of Evergreen Terrace). Shortly after forming, the band wrote several songs and recorded a five-song demo entitled Are Some Crucial Dudes. Not long after this, the band recorded their first full-length The Few, The Proud, The Crucial which was released on Indianola Records. After several member changes, the band recorded their second full-length, The Messenger, which was released on Eulogy Records in June 2006. In 2008 the band departed Eulogy.

Casey Jones released their final album, I Hope We're Not the Last, on January 11, 2011. It also marked the band's final year of touring.

Casey Jones disbanded in 2012. After disbanding Casey Jones released a documentary about the life and death of the band entitled Start To Finish.

Former members

Josh James - Vocals
Caleb James - Drums
James Siboni - Bass
Evan Judd - Guitar
John Howard - Guitar
Jason Southwell - Guitar
Josh Smith - Bass
Josh Card - Guitar

Discography
The Few, The Proud, The Crucial (2004) - Indianola Records
The Messenger (2006) - Eulogy Records
I Hope We're Not the Last (2011) - Independent Release

Documentary
Start To Finish (2012)

References

External links
Eulogy Recordings, Casey Jones's record label
Casey Jones Bio
Photo Gallery: Casey Jones @ The Hi-Fi, Brisbane May 2010 - LifeMusicMedia.com

Hardcore punk groups from Florida
Musical groups from Jacksonville, Florida
Straight edge groups
2003 establishments in Florida
Musical groups established in 2003
Indianola Records artists
Eulogy Recordings artists